Mikely Wilhelm Adam (born January 8, 1992), better known by his stage name Mike Free, is an American record producer, DJ, and songwriter from South Central, Los Angeles. While attending Hampton University in Virginia, Free began working with DJ Mustard, who introduced him to Los Angeles- based artists including YG and Ty Dolla Sign. Free's first success came via his co-production work on Tyga’s "Rack City" with DJ Mustard, which was certified 4 times platinum by the Recording Industry Association of America (RIAA).

Singles Produced

Other Production

2013 

 Nipsey Hussle – Crenshaw
 02. "U See Us"
 R. Kelly – Black Panties
 11. "Spend That" (featuring Young Jeezy)

2014

 YG – My Krazy Life
 06. "Meet The Flockers" (featuring Tee Cee)
17. "My Nigga (Remix)" (featuring Lil Wayne, Nicki Minaj, Meek Mill and Rich Homie Quan)
 DJ Mustard – 10 Summers
05. "Giuseppe" (featuring 2 Chainz, Young Jeezy and Yo Gotti)
07. "Down On Me" (featuring 2 Chainz and Ty Dolla Sign)
13. "Vato" (featuring Que, YG, and Jeezy)
 E-40 – Sharp On All 4 Corners: Corner 1
03. "Money Sack" (featuring Boosie Badazz)
07. "Three Jobs"
 E-40 – Sharp On All 4 Corners: Corner 2
01. "It's The First" (featuring Cousin Fik & Turk Talk)
02. "That's Right" (featuring Ty Dolla Sign)
 YG – Blame It On the Streets
03. "Blame It On The Streets" (featuring Jay 305)
06. "If I Ever" (featuring TeeCee4800 & Charley Hood)
 Kid Ink
"Show Me (Remix)" (featuring Trey Songz, Juicy J, 2 Chainz & Chris Brown)

2015
 Chris Brown & Tyga – Fan of a Fan: The Album
02. "Nothin' Like Me" (featuring Ty Dolla Sign)
16. "Banjo"
 Jamie Foxx – Hollywood: A Story of a Dozen Rose
17. "Pretty Thing"

2016
 E-40 – The D-Boy Diary: Book 1
10. "Stay Away" (featuring Eric Bellinger)
 Dom Kennedy – Los Angeles Is Not For Sale, Vol. 1
13. "U Got It Like That" (featuring Niko G4)
14. "Johnny Bench"

2017

 Problem – Chachiville
13. "All Year"
 Jay 305 – Taking All Bets
09. "Why You So Nasty?" (featuring Travis Scott)

2018

 Rich The Kid – The World Is Yours
03. "No Question" (featuring Future)
 Lil Wayne – Tha Carter V
16. "Open Safe"
 Problem – S2
02. "Put It Down" (featuring 03 Greedo)
 Salma Slims
"Nobody"

2020
 Eric Bellinger & Nieman J – Optimal Music
03. "Alone" (featuring Blxst)

2021
 Philthy Rich – Phillip Beasley
09. "Too Bad" (featuring Jim Jones & Landstrip Chip)

References



Record producers from California
Living people
Musicians from Los Angeles
1992 births
African-American record producers
21st-century American musicians
West Coast hip hop musicians
American people of Belizean descent
American people of Haitian descent
21st-century African-American musicians